Fatima Yousufi is an Afghan footballer who plays as a goalkeeper for Melbourne Victory FC AWT.

Career

In 2022, Yousufi signed for Australian seventh tier side Melbourne Victory FC AWT.

References

Afghan expatriate sportspeople in Australia
Afghan women's footballers
Expatriate women's soccer players in Australia
Living people
Women's association football forwards
Year of birth missing (living people)